The 2006 Auckland Open (also named ASB Classic for sponsorship reasons) was a 2006 WTA Tour women's tennis tournament, played on outdoor hard courts. It was the 21st edition of the WTA Auckland Open. It took place at the ASB Tennis Centre in Auckland, New Zealand, from 2 to 7 January 2006.

Points and prize money

Point distribution

Prize money

* per team

Singles main-draw entrants

Seeds

 1 Rankings as of 19 December 2005.

Other entrants
The following players received wildcards into the singles main draw:
  Victoria Azarenka
  Jelena Dokic

The following players received entry from the qualifying draw:
  Ashley Harkleroad
  Anne Kremer
  Tzipora Obziler
  Shenay Perry

Retirements
  Nadia Petrova (left groin strain)

Doubles main-draw entrants

Seeds

1 Rankings as of 19 December 2005.

Other entrants
The following pair received wildcards into the doubles main draw:
  Leanne Baker /  Francesca Lubiani

The following pair received entry from the qualifying draw:
  Julia Schruff /  Ágnes Szávay

Withdrawals
During the tournament
  Julia Schruff /  Ágnes Szávay (right thigh strain on Schruff)

Finals

Singles

  Marion Bartoli defeated  Vera Zvonareva 6–2, 6–2
It was the 1st title for Bartoli in her career.

Doubles

  Elena Likhovtseva /  Vera Zvonareva defeated  Émilie Loit /  Barbora Strýcová 6–3, 6–4
It was the 25th title for Likhovtseva and the 3rd title for Zvonareva in their respective doubles careers.

See also
 2006 Heineken Open – men's tournament

References

External links
 Official Results Archive (ITF)
 Official Results Archive (WTA)

2006 WTA Tour
2006
2006 in New Zealand women's sport
January 2006 sports events in New Zealand
2006 in New Zealand tennis